Arthur Fritiof Lundblom (1900–1991) was an American Swedish physician, writer and beekeeper.

Biografi 
Arthur Lundblom was born on 15 July 1900 in New York City, United States, to Alrik Lundblom, a sea captain och ship builder master at Djurgården shipyard, and Bertha Georgina (née Lindgren). He grew up in New York City, the Azores and on Djurgården in Stockholm, and married the nurse Mona (née Ljungström), daughter of Fredrik Ljungström. Brother-in-law to Emil Carelius and father-in-law to :sv:Claes Sylwander.

After Licentiate of Medicine with specialty in orthopaedics at Stockholms högskola, future Stockholm University, he was occupied as regiment military physician at Life Guard Dragoons and Svea Engineer Corps. He also served as counselor for the predecessor of the National Agency for Education, as a surgeon in own private clinic, as well as with plague hospitals in Africa.

As an expert in beekeeping, he served for the Swedish Beekeepers Association in evaluations of bee races suitable for the Swedish climate etc. Besides articles and essays in scientific publications, he authored the book Honungsbiet i Saga och Sanning (English: "The honey bee in saga and reality") (1959) the same year he won "10 000-kronorsfrågan" on bees in Kvitt eller dubbelt with Nils Erik Bæhrendtz on SVT. In 1967 his documentary film Honungsjakt och pilgift (English: "Honey hunt and arrow poison") together with :sv:Nils Linnman was broadcast on SVT, about honeyguides and the Maasai people in the newly established Maasai Mara game reserve in Kenya.

Arthur Lundblom died on 9 April 1991 and was buried at Norra begravningsplatsen in Stockholm.

Biblio- and filmography
 On Congenital Ulnar Deviation of the Fingers of Familial Occurrence in :sv:Acta Orthopaedica, Volume 3, 1932 Issue 3
 Honungsbiet i Saga och Sanning (Natur & Kultur 1959)
 Stora biboken – människan och biet genom tiderna (:sv:Dag W. Scharp 1966, editorial staff together with :sv:Åke Hansson och :sv:Nils Pellmyr)
 Honungsjakt och pilgift (1967) (together with :sv:Nils Linnman)

Distinctions

 "10 000-kronorsfrågan" on bees in Kvitt eller dubbelt on SVT
 Royal Patriotic Society: medal of merit in beekeeping
 Swedish Beekeepers Association: honorary plaque

References

1900 births
1991 deaths
20th-century American male writers
20th-century American physicians
20th-century Swedish male writers
20th-century Swedish physicians
American military doctors
American orthopedic surgeons
Burials at Norra begravningsplatsen
Military personnel from New York City
Physicians from New York City
Stockholm University alumni
Swedish food writers
Swedish military doctors
Swedish orthopedic surgeons
Swedish surgeons
Swedish television personalities
Television personalities from New York City
Writers from New York City
20th-century American writers
20th-century surgeons
American beekeepers
Swedish beekeepers
American emigrants to Sweden
American expatriates in Portugal